This is a list of cities and towns in Republika Srpska:

Banja Luka 
Berkovići 
Bijeljina 
Kostajnica
Kozarska Dubica 
Bosanski Brod  
Bosanska Gradiška  
Derventa 
Doboj (RS)
Foča 
Istočno Sarajevo (RS) 
Laktaši 
Modriča 
Nevesinje
Novi Grad (RS)
Petrovo
Prijedor 
Prnjavor 
Srebrenica 
Teslić
Trebinje
Zvornik
Sipovo